Lisa Martinez-Douarche (born 13 June 2000) is a French footballer who currently plays as a defender for Rangers in the Scottish Women's Premier League.

Career
Martinez started her career at Montpellier Hérault Sport Club. In 2018 she was part of the team that won the French Under 19 League. She made her debut in the first division during 2018-19 season and signed her first professional contract on 19 June 2019.
She joined Rangers 8 September 2019 initially until January 2020 but the loan was extended until June 2020.
She returned to France and signed with second division team FC Metz for season 2020–21. The following year she joined first division team ASJ Soyaux-Charente.
On 4 August 2022 Martinez returned to Rangers.

International career

Martinez represented France at Under-17 level six times and Under-19 level 17 times, scoring 1 goal, including five games at the 2019 European Under-19 Championship which was won by France. She also played twice for the Under-20 team.

Honours

Club
Montpellier
 French U19 Championship: 2018-19
Rangers
 Scottish Women's Premier League Cup: 2022

International
 European Under 19 Championship : 2019

References

2000 births
French women's footballers
Living people
Women's association football defenders
Rangers W.F.C. players
Footballers from Montpellier
Montpellier HSC (women) players
FC Metz (women) players
ASJ Soyaux-Charente players
Scottish Women's Premier League players
Division 1 Féminine players
Division 2 Féminine players
French expatriate sportspeople in Scotland
French expatriate women's footballers
Expatriate women's footballers in Scotland
France women's youth international footballers